The 2013–14 Providence Friars men's basketball team represented Providence College during the 2013–14 NCAA Division I men's basketball season. The Friars, led by third-year head coach Ed Cooley, played their home games at the Dunkin' Donuts Center, and were in their first season as members of the reorganized Big East Conference. They finished the season 23–12, 10–8 in Big East play to finish in a three-way tie for third place. They were champions of the Big East tournament to earn the conference's automatic bid to the NCAA tournament where they lost in the second round to North Carolina.

Roster

Incoming recruits

Class of 2014 recruits

Schedule 

|-
!colspan=9 style="background:#000000; color:#C0C0C0;"| Exhibition games

|-
!colspan=9 style="background:#000000; color:#C0C0C0;"| Regular season

|-
!colspan=9 style="background:#000000; color:#C0C0C0;"| Big East tournament

|-
!colspan=9 style="background:#000000; color:#C0C0C0;"| NCAA tournament

Source:

Awards and honors

References

Providence Friars men's basketball seasons
Providence
Providence
Providence
Providence